Catherine I Alekseevna Mikhailova (born , ;  – ) was the second wife and empress consort of Peter the Great, and Empress Regnant of Russia from 1725 until her death in 1727.

Life as a servant
The life of Catherine I was said by Voltaire to be nearly as extraordinary as that of Peter the Great himself. Only uncertain and contradictory information is available about her early life. Said to have been born on 15 April 1684 (o.s. 5 April), she was originally named Marta Helena Skowrońska. Marta was the daughter of Samuel Skowroński (later spelt Samuil Skavronsky), a Roman Catholic farmer from the eastern parts of the Polish–Lithuanian Commonwealth, born to Minsker parents. In 1680 he married Dorothea Hahn at Jakobstadt. Her mother is named in at least one source as Elizabeth Moritz, the daughter of a Baltic German woman and there is debate as to whether Moritz's father was a Swedish officer. It is likely that two stories were conflated, and Swedish sources suggest that the Elizabeth Moritz story is probably incorrect. Some biographies state that Marta's father was a gravedigger and handyman, while others speculate that he was a runaway landless serf.

Marta's parents died of the plague around 1689, leaving five children. According to one of the popular versions, at the age of three Marta was taken by an aunt and sent to Marienburg (the present-day Alūksne in Latvia, near the border with Estonia and Russia) where she was raised by Johann Ernst Glück, a Lutheran pastor and educator who was the first to translate the Bible into Latvian. In his household she served as a lowly servant, likely either a scullery maid or washerwoman.  No effort was made to teach her to read and write and she remained illiterate throughout her life.

Marta was considered a very beautiful young girl, and there are accounts that Frau Glück became fearful that she would become involved with her son. At the age of seventeen, she was married off to a Swedish dragoon, Johan Cruse or Johann Rabbe, with whom she remained for eight days in 1702, at which point the Swedish troops were withdrawn from Marienburg. When Russian forces captured the town, Pastor Glück offered to work as a translator, and Field Marshal Boris Sheremetev agreed to his proposal and took him to Moscow.

There are unsubstantiated stories that Marta worked briefly in the laundry of the victorious regiment, and also that she was presented in her undergarments to Brigadier General Rudolph Felix Bauer, later the Governor of Estonia, to be his mistress. She may have worked in the household of his superior, Sheremetev. It is not known whether she was his mistress, or household maid.  She travelled back to the Russian court with Sheremetev's army.

Afterwards she became part of the household of Prince Alexander Menshikov, who was the best friend of Peter the Great of Russia. Anecdotal sources suggest that she was purchased by him. Whether the two of them were lovers is disputed, as Menshikov was already engaged to Darya Arsenyeva, his future wife. It is clear that Menshikov and Marta formed a lifetime alliance.

It is possible that Menshikov, who was quite jealous of Peter's attentions and knew his tastes, wanted to procure a mistress on whom he could rely. In any case, in 1703, while visiting Menshikov at his home, Peter met Marta. In 1704, she was well established in the Tsar's household as his mistress, and gave birth to a son, Peter. In 1703, she converted to Orthodoxy and took the new name of Catherine Alexeyevna (Yekaterina Alexeyevna). She and Darya Menshikova accompanied Peter and Menshikov on their military excursions.

Marriage and family life
Though no record exists, Catherine and Peter are described as having married secretly between 23 October and 1 December 1707 in Saint Petersburg. They had twelve children, two of whom survived into adulthood, Anna (born 1708) and Elizabeth (born 1709).

Peter had moved the capital to St. Petersburg in 1703. While the city was being built he lived in a three-room log cabin with Catherine, where she did the cooking and caring for the children, and he tended a garden as though they were an ordinary couple. The relationship was the most successful of Peter's life and a great number of letters exist demonstrating the strong affection between Catherine and Peter. As a person she was very energetic, compassionate, charming, and always cheerful. She was able to calm Peter in his frequent rages and often was called in to do so.
Catherine went with Peter on his Pruth Campaign in 1711. There, she was said to have saved Peter and his Empire, as related by Voltaire in his book Peter the Great. Surrounded by overwhelming numbers of Turkish troops, Catherine suggested before surrendering, that her jewels and those of the other women be used in an effort to bribe the Ottoman grand vizier Baltacı Mehmet Pasha into allowing a retreat.

Mehmet allowed the retreat, whether motivated by the bribe or considerations of trade and diplomacy. In any case Peter credited Catherine and proceeded to marry her again (this time officially) at Saint Isaac's Cathedral in St. Petersburg on 9 February 1712.  She was Peter's second wife; he had previously married and divorced Eudoxia Lopukhina, who had borne him the Tsarevich Alexis Petrovich. Upon their wedding, Catherine took the style of her husband and became Tsarina. When Peter elevated the Russian Tsardom to Empire, Catherine became Empress. The Order of Saint Catherine was instituted by her husband on the occasion of their wedding.

Issue
Catherine and Peter had twelve children, all of whom died in childhood except Anna and Elizabeth:

 Peter Petrovich (Winter 1704 - 1707), died in infancy
 Paul Petrovich (October 1705 - 1707), died in infancy
 Catherine Petrovna (7 February 1707–7 August 1708)
 Grand Duchess Anna Petrovna (27 January 1708–15 May 1728)
 Grand Duchess Elizabeth Petrovna (29 December 1709–5 January 1762)
 Grand Duchess Mary Natalia Petrovna (20 March 1713–17 May 1715)
 Grand Duchess Margaret Petrovna (19 September 1714–7 June 1715)
 Grand Duke Peter Petrovich (9 November 1715–6 May 1719)

 Grand Duke Paul Petrovich (13 January 1717–14 January 1717)
 Grand Duchess Natalia Petrovna (31 August 1718–15 March 1725)
 Grand Duke Peter Petrovich (7 October 1723–7 October 1723)
 Grand Duke Paul Petrovich (1724–1724)

Siblings
Upon Peter's death, Catherine found her four siblings, Krystyna, Anna, Karol, and Fryderyk, gave them the newly created titles of Count and Countess, and brought them to Russia.

 Krystyna Skowrońska, renamed Christina Samuilovna Skavronskaya (1687–14 April 1729), had married Simon Heinrich (1672–1728) and their descendants became the Counts Gendrikov.
 Anna Skowrońska, renamed Anna Samuilovna Skavronskaya, had married one Michael-Joachim N and their descendants became the Counts Efimovsky.
 Karol Skowroński, renamed Karel Samuilovich Skavronsky, was created a Count of the Russian Empire on 5 January 1727 and made a Chamberlain of the Imperial Court; he had married Maria Ivanovna, a Russian woman, by whom he had descendants who became extinct in the male line withe the death of Count Paul Martinovich Skavronskyi (1757-1793), father of Princess Catherine Bagration.
 Fryderyk Skowroński, renamed Feodor Samuilovich Skavronsky, was created a Count of the Russian Empire on 5 January 1727 and was married twice: to N, a Lithuanian woman, and to Ekaterina Rodionovna Saburova, without having children by either of them.

Reign as Empress Regnant 

Catherine was crowned in 1724. The year before his death, Peter and Catherine had an estrangement over her support of Willem Mons, brother of Peter's former mistress Anna, and brother to one of the current ladies in waiting to Catherine, Matryona. He served as secretary to Catherine. Peter had fought his entire life to clear up corruption in Russia. Catherine had a great deal of influence on who could gain access to her husband. Willem Mons and his sister Matryona had begun selling their influence to those who wanted access to Catherine and, through her, to Peter. Apparently this had been overlooked by Catherine, who was fond of both. Peter found out and had Willem Mons executed and his sister Matryona exiled. He and Catherine did not speak for several months. Rumors flew that she and Mons had had an affair, but there is no evidence for this.

Peter died (28 January 1725 Old Style) without naming a successor. Catherine represented the interests of the "new men", commoners who had been brought to positions of great power by Peter based on competence. A change of government was likely to favor the entrenched aristocrats. For that reason during a meeting of a council to decide on a successor, a coup was arranged by Menshikov and others in which the guards regiments with whom Catherine was very popular proclaimed her the ruler of Russia. Supporting evidence was "produced" from Peter's secretary Makarov and the Bishop of Pskov, both "new men" with motivation to see Catherine take over. The real power, however, lay with Menshikov, Peter Tolstoy, and with other members of the Supreme Privy Council.

Catherine viewed the deposed empress Eudoxia as a threat, so she secretly moved her to Shlisselburg Fortress near St. Petersburg to be put in a secret prison under strict custody as a state prisoner.

Death
Catherine I died two years after Peter I, on 17 May 1727 at age 43, in St. Petersburg, where she was buried at St. Peter and St. Paul Fortress. Tuberculosis, diagnosed as an abscess of the lungs, caused her early demise.

Before her death she recognized Peter II, the grandson of Peter I and Eudoxia, as her successor.

Assessment and legacy

Catherine was the first woman to rule Imperial Russia, opening the legal path for a century almost entirely dominated by women, including her daughter Elizabeth and granddaughter-in-law Catherine the Great, all of whom continued Peter the Great's policies in modernizing Russia.  At the time of Peter's death the Russian Army, composed of 130,000 men and supplemented by another 100,000 Cossacks, was easily the largest in Europe.  However, the expense of the military was proving ruinous to the Russian economy, consuming some 65% of the government's annual revenue.  Since the nation was at peace, Catherine was determined to reduce military expenditure.  For most of her reign, Catherine I was controlled by her advisers.  However, on this single issue, the reduction of military expenses, Catherine was able to have her way.  The resulting tax relief on the peasantry led to the reputation of Catherine I as a just and fair ruler.

The Supreme Privy Council concentrated power in the hands of one party, and thus was an executive innovation. In foreign affairs, Russia reluctantly joined the Austro-Spanish league to defend the interests of Catherine's son-in-law, the Duke of Holstein, against Great Britain.

Catherine gave her name to Catherinehof near St. Petersburg, and built the first bridges in the new capital. She was also the first royal owner of the Tsarskoye Selo estate, where the Catherine Palace still bears her name.

The city of Yekaterinburg is named after her, Yekaterina being the Russian form of her name.

She also gave her name to the Kadriorg Palace (German: Katharinental, meaning "Catherine's Valley"), its adjacent Kadriorg Park and the later Kadriorg neighbourhood of Tallinn, Estonia, which today houses the Presidential Palace of Estonia. The name of the neighbourhood is also used as a metonym for the institution of the President.

In general, Catherine's policies were reasonable and cautious.  The story of her humble origins was considered by later generations of tsars to be a state secret.

See also
 Bibliography of Russian history (1613–1917)
 Rulers of Russia family tree

Notes

References
 
 

History of the Russian Empire Under Peter the Great (Vol. I 1759; Vol. II 1763).
Royal Babylon: The Alarming History of European Royalty Broadway; New York, 2001

External links

  – Historical reconstruction "The Romanovs". StarMedia. Babich-Design(Russia, 2013)

 
 

 
 

 
 

1684 births
1727 deaths
18th-century Russian monarchs
18th-century women from the Russian Empire
People from Jēkabpils
People from the Duchy of Courland and Semigallia
Russian empresses regnant
Russian empresses consorts
House of Romanov
Converts to Eastern Orthodoxy from Roman Catholicism
Eastern Orthodox monarchs
Baltic German people from the Russian Empire
Russian people of Belarusian descent
Russian people of Swedish descent
17th-century Russian women
17th-century Latvian people
18th-century women rulers
18th-century Latvian people
18th-century deaths from tuberculosis
Tuberculosis deaths in Russia
Burials at Saints Peter and Paul Cathedral, Saint Petersburg
Recipients of the Order of the White Eagle (Poland)